Sentul International Convention Center or the SICC is a commercial conference hall in the residential area of Sentul City, Babakan Madang, Bogor Regency, West Java, right on the side of the Jagorawi highway. Initially the building was known as Bukit Sentul Convention Center (BSCC), then Sentul City Convention Center (SCCC). The Sentul International Convention Center (SICC) name has been used since May 2009.

It is built on a land area of 6.4 hectares with a building area of 22,000 square meters. SICC room can accommodate 11,000 people at the main hall and 2,000 in another venue, larger than the Jakarta Convention Center, Jakarta. This building is a multifunctional building and hosts numerous concerts and conferences. This building is equipped with main hall, exhibition hall, meeting room, function hall, VIP & VVIP access, and parking lot.

Notable events

Notes

Buildings and structures in West Java
Convention centres in Indonesia
Bogor Regency